"Mr. Perfect" is a song by the Greek singer Helena Paparizou. The song's title was announced in mid-November and was released on 2 December 2011. The song will be left as a digital release on iTunes due to Helena changed label recently and eliminated from Sony Music Greece.

Release and promotion
On 28 November 2011, Sony Music Greece announced a 5 December 2011 release date and presented a video clip via their official YouTube account that featured a 23-second teaser of the song and the cover art. Due to high anticipation, the song was instead released three days ahead of schedule on 2 December, with its digital download in Greece and Cyprus on 5 December as planned. The song is also available on digital music stores of several European countries.
Paparizou performed the song 11 December during the 6th show of Dancing On Ice and later added it to her setlist at her appearances in Thessaloniki at Pyli Axiou with Giannis Parios. Paparizou also performed a remix of the song by Playmen, at the second annual Madwalk By Vodafone, along with Joan Jett's "I Hate Myself For Loving You".

Music video
A music video for the song was filmed by director Konstantinos Rigos in November 2011. Model Nikos Douramanis plays Paparizou's romantic interest. The music video was released on 31 December, and later uploaded at Paparizou's official VEVO channel at YouTube.

Track listing
Digital download
"Mr. Perfect" – 3:36
"Mr. Perfect" Playmen Remix - 3:42

Charts

Release history

References

2011 singles
Helena Paparizou songs
English-language Swedish songs
Songs written by Iain James